The 1885–86 Scottish Cup was the 13th season of Scotland's most prestigious football knockout competition. Queen's Park won the competition for the eighth time after they beat defending champions Renton 3–1 in the final.

Arbroath set a world record in the first round when they defeated Bon Accord 36–0 on 12 September 1885. The score remains a record in British senior football and globally for a match that was not fixed or thrown. Coincidentally, on the same day, Dundee Harp recorded an equally one-sided victory as they beat Aberdeen Rovers 35–0.

Calendar

Two teams qualified for the second round after drawing their first round replay.

Teams
All 134 teams entered the competition in the first round.

First round
Alloa Athletic, Dykehead, Pilgrims and Queen of the South Wanderers received a bye to the second round.

Matches

Replays

Notes

Second round
Cartvale, Partick Thistle, Thornhill and West Calder received a bye to the third round.

Matches

Replays

Second Replays

Third Replay

Fourth Replay

Notes

Third round 
Cambuslang received a bye to the fourth round.

Matches

Replay

Fourth round
Port Glasgow Athletic received a bye to the fifth round.

Matches

Replay

Second replay

Fifth round

Matches

Replays

Second replay

Quarter-final
Queen's Park, Renton and 3rd Lanark RV received a bye to the semi-finals.

Match

Semi-finals

Matches

Final

See also
1885–86 in Scottish football

References

External links
RSSSF: Scottish Cup 1885–86
London Hearts Scottish Cup Results 1885–86
Scottish Football Archive 1885–86

Cup
Scottish Cup seasons
Scot